Radivojević or Radivojevich (Cyrillic script: Радивојевић) is a patronymic surname derived from a masculine given name Radivoje. Notable people with the surname include:
Branko Radivojevič (born 1980), Slovak professional ice hockey player of Serbian ancestry
Desnica Radivojević, Bosnian politician
Juraj Radivojević (died c. 1408), Bosnian nobleman
Jovan Radivojević (born 1982), Serbian professional football player
Katarina Radivojević (born 1979), Serbian actress
Milan Radivojević, Yugoslav basketball player
Miloš Radivojević (born 1939), Serbian television and movie director
Paul von Radivojevich (1759–1829), Austrian general of the Napoleonic era of Serbian antecedents
Saša Radivojević (born 1979), Serbian professional football goalkeeper
Vladimir Radivojević (born 1986), Serbian professional football player
Vuk Radivojević (born 1983), Serbian professional basketball player
Julija Radivojević (born 1799), Serbian writer

Serbian surnames
Patronymic surnames